The 1951 Marshall Thundering Herd football team was an American football team that represented Marshall University in the Ohio Valley Conference (OVC) during the 1951 college football season. In its second season under head coach Pete Pederson, the team compiled a 5–4–1 record (4–2 against conference opponents) and outscored opponents by a total of 206 to 176. The team played its home games at Fairfield Stadium in Huntington, West Virginia.

Schedule

References

Marshall
Marshall Thundering Herd football seasons
Marshall Thundering Herd football